Pseudostomatella martini is a species of small sea snail, a marine gastropod mollusk in the family Trochidae, the top snails.

Description
The shell size varies between 5 mm and 20 mm.

Distribution
This species occurs in the ocean around the Philippines.

References

External links
 

martini
Gastropods described in 2006